The Week-End is a lost 1920 American silent comedy film directed by George L. Cox and starring Margarita Fischer and Milton Sills. It was produced and distributed by Pathé Exchange.

Cast
Margarita Fischer as Vera Middleton
Milton Sills as Arthur Tavenor
Bertram Grassby as Spencer Jardine
Harvey Clark as Watt Middleton
Mary Wise as Mrs. Watt Middleton
Mayme Kelso as Mrs. Grace Maynard
Beverly Travers as Mrs. Clara Churchill
Harry Lonsdale as James Corbin
Lillian Leighton as Mrs. James Corbin

References

External links

1920 films
American silent feature films
Lost American films
American black-and-white films
1920 lost films
1920 comedy films
Films directed by George L. Cox
Pathé Exchange films
1920s American films
Silent American comedy films
1920s English-language films